Gustav Schädler (18 November 1883, in Triesenberg – 19 June 1961, in Vaduz) was a politician from Liechtenstein and Prime Minister of Liechtenstein from 1922 to 1928.

Prime Minister of Liechtenstein
Schädler served as Prime Minister of Liechtenstein between 1922 and 1928. He was a member of the Christian-Social People's Party (VP), and is the only member of the VP to have served as a Prime Minister. His government was responsible for creating a monetary union with Switzerland in 1924.

See also
 Politics of Liechtenstein

References

1883 births
1961 deaths
Heads of government of Liechtenstein
Christian-Social People's Party politicians